Pioneer is the first studio album by Pioneer. Slospeak Records released the album on January 24, 2012.

Critical reception

Dr. Tony Shore, signaling in a four star review from HM, write, "just take a listen to this fun, powerful release from a great band with a new name." Awarding the album four stars from Jesus Freak Hideout, Nathaniel Schexnayder writes, "it spins remarkably well for a new band." Scott Fryberger, rating the album four stars for Jesus Freak Hideout, states, "Pioneer is a good dose of alternative rock with some pop punk qualities." Giving the album three and a half stars at New Release Tuesday, Jonathan J. Francesco describes, "Pioneer offers a thoughtful and pleasant soft rock release". Keith Settles, indicating in a four star review by Indie Vision Music, says, "Pioneer has released an above average full length album thanks to solid production and good song writing."

Track listing

References

2012 debut albums
Pioneer (band) albums